The Cameo is an Edinburgh cinema which started life as the King's Cinema on 8 January 1914 and is one of the oldest cinemas in Scotland still in use. Since becoming the Cameo in 1949, it has had a tradition of showing art house films. From 1949 onward it has been an important venue for the Edinburgh International Film Festival. It is at Tollcross, and since 1992 has been a three-screen cinema. The Cameo was an independent cinema until 2012, when it was bought by the Picturehouse chain, owned by Cineworld.

History

Behind a modern shopfront, much of the cinema's original architectural character remains. The entrance lobby has a terrazzo floor and one of the original pair of ticket kiosks. An inner foyer leads to the main cinema built within  the 'back green' or 'back court' (courtyard) of a tenement block. Cinemas were once built like this elsewhere in Scotland, the biggest being the Rosevale in Partick, but the Cameo is the only one still operating.

The original screen was mirrored, the first mirrored screen in Scotland, and there were 673 seats in an auditorium showing silent films with orchestral accompaniment, supplied at one time by Madam Egger's Ladies' Costume Orchestra. In 1930 the cinema was fitted for sound and could start showing talkies. The space has been left largely unchanged structurally, but the audience now have better sightlines and more comfort with fewer than half the original number of seats. There is an abundance of ornamental plasterwork: columns, cornices, decorative mouldings on walls and ceilings.

The cinema, and the full tenement it is part of, was awarded Category B listed status by Historic Scotland in 2006.

Jim Poole

In 1949 the cinema was renamed the Cameo by the new owner, Jim Poole (1911–1998), a member of the Poole family who were known for their touring Myriorama shows and who ran cinemas in Scotland and England. He had been in charge of two of the family's cinemas in Aberdeen before the Second World War, and after a posting as army entertainments officer in the Middle East, wanted to open a venue in Edinburgh where he could show foreign films.

The Cameo included art house and 'continental' films in its repertoire and started its association with the Edinburgh Film Festival in 1949, when it presented a 'Continental Film Festival', including a screen version of Sartre's Les jeux sont faits, alongside the documentaries being shown by the Edinburgh Film Guild. Monsieur Hulot's Holiday (1953) and Annie Hall (1977) were among Poole's successes in attracting good audiences for films not being shown by the big chains.

Poole had begun by rescuing a decaying building with a leaky roof. Later he was able to take over an adjacent shop which, in December 1963, became the first licensed (to sell alcoholic drinks) cinema bar in the city, despite neighbours' objections. When Poole retired in 1982 the Cameo stayed shut until 1986.

After 1986

Once the Edinburgh Filmhouse had opened in 1979 a few hundred yards away, the Cameo was no longer the only public cinema in Edinburgh showing alternative and foreign-language films. After a new owner took possession in 1986 more neighbouring shops were acquired to create space for second and third screens which opened in the early 1990s. A 2005 renovation plan proposing to change the original auditorium into a bar-restaurant was withdrawn after a well-supported 'Save the Cameo' campaign influenced council decision-making. In September 2006 Historic Scotland upgraded the conservation status of the cinema to a B listing, thus protecting the interior from future alteration. The Cinema Theatre Association had campaigned for this after the owners, Picturehouse, put the Cameo up for sale. They have now taken it off the market, drawn up new refurbishment plans, and invited contributions from sponsors.

The first film shown at the Cameo, in March 1949, was La symphonie pastorale, a rare surviving print of which was shown again at the cinema in March 2009 to celebrate the 60th anniversary of the building re-opening as the Cameo.

The Cinema was named as one of the 10 best Independent Cinemas in the Guardian in January 2010.

Famous visitors

Lillian Gish, Orson Welles, Melina Mercouri and Cary Grant all visited the cinema in one Festival season or another. Sean Connery, who was born nearby, opened the bar in 1963. More recently Quentin Tarantino was there when Pulp Fiction opened in 1994 and Irvine Welsh was at the Cameo for the World première of Trainspotting in February 1996.

Other famous visitors throughout the years include Danny Boyle, Richard E. Grant, Fred Zinnemann, Robert Carlyle, Michèle Morgan, Peter Mullan, Christine Lahti, Mark Kermode, Claire Denis, Rutger Hauer, Liam Gallagher, Patsy Kensit, Ewan McGregor, Tim Roth, Guy Ritchie, Ken Loach, Bruce Campbell, Billy Bragg, Park Chan-wook, Ray Winstone, Robyn Hitchcock, Neil Jordan, Roy Keane, Charlize Theron, Duncan Jones, Michael Redgrave, Jim Dale, Gael Garcia Bernal, Diego Luna, Alfonso Cuarón, Alejandro González Iñárritu, John Cusack, Tommy Wiseau and Danny Dyer.

In popular culture 

The cinema appears in Sylvain Chomet's film The Illusionist. While hiding from the young couple, the main character, Tatischeff, accidentally enters the cinema, where Jacques Tati's Mon Oncle is playing. This is an in-joke as Tatischeff is largely based on Tati, the film itself having been adapted from a script of his. Other films with scenes filmed inside the Cameo include Helena Bonham Carter's Woman Talking Dirty and Richard Jobson's A Woman in Winter.

Sources
Scotland's Cinemas
Scran
Interview with Jim Poole in Scotland on Sunday, 7 April 1996
The Scotsman obituary of Jim Poole, 21 January 1998
The Independent obituary of Jim Poole, 31 March 1998
Save the Cameo campaign
The Scotsman, 12 November 2005

References

External links
 

Cinemas in Edinburgh
History of Edinburgh
Category B listed buildings in Edinburgh